Francesco Guinigi (died 1578) was a Roman Catholic prelate who served as Bishop of Corneto e Montefiascone (1573–1578).

Biography
On 8 April 1573, Francesco Guinigi was appointed during the papacy of Pope Gregory XIII as Bishop of Corneto e Montefiascone.
He served as Bishop of Corneto e Montefiascone until his death on January 1578.

References

External links and additional sources
 (for Chronology of Bishops) 
 (for Chronology of Bishops) 

16th-century Italian Roman Catholic bishops
Bishops appointed by Pope Gregory XIII
1578 deaths
Year of birth missing